Orophea is a genus of flowering plants in the family Annonaceae. There are about 37 species native to Asia.

These are trees and shrubs. The flowers have six petals in two whorls, the outer petals smaller than the inner. The inner petals are attached at the tips to form a cap shape.

Species include:
Orophea anceps
Orophea celebica
Orophea corymbosa
Orophea creaghii
Orophea cumingiana
Orophea diepenhorstii
Orophea ellipanthoides
Orophea hainanensis
Orophea hastata King
Orophea hirsuta
Orophea laui
Orophea multiflora Jovet-Ast
Orophea palawanensis Elm.
Orophea narasimhanii
Orophea submaculata Elm.
Orophea thomsoni Beddome
Orophea uniflora Hook.f. & Thomson
Orophea yunnanensis P.T.Li

References
 

 
Annonaceae genera
Taxonomy articles created by Polbot